"Coming Home" is the Icelandic entry for the Eurovision Song Contest 2011. It was performed by the tribute band Sjonni's Friends, made up of musicians Hreimur Örn Heimisson, Gunnar Ólason, Benedikt Brynleifsson, Vignir Snær Vigfússon, Matthías Matthíasson and Pálmi Sigurhjartarson, all of whom had worked with Sjonni.

The original singer, Sjonni Brink or just Sjonni (real name Sigurjón Brink) died days before the Icelandic national selection for the contest, after which his musician friends decided to form Sjonni's Friends (sometimes also known as Sigurjón's Friends) and perform the song as a tribute. It finished in 20th place in the finals with 61 points.

Brass was recorded in New York by Grammy award participant Danny Flam (of Kanye West's "All of the lights" fame) and Ron Bertolet.

Charts

References

External links
 Eurovision.tv

Eurovision songs of 2011
Eurovision songs of Iceland
2011 singles
2011 songs